The Magnus Hirschfeld Medal is awarded by the German Society for Social-Scientific Sexuality Research (DGSS) for outstanding service to sexual science, granted in the categories "Sexual Research" and "Sexual Reform". It is named in honour of German sexology pioneer Magnus Hirschfeld (without the DGSS sharing his dated 'biologistic' sexual theory).

Winners for contributions to sexual research

 1990 Ernest Borneman (Austria)
 1992 John P. De Cecco (USA)
 1994 Liu Dalin (China)
 1997 Jonathan Ned Katz (USA)
 2000 Milton Diamond (USA)
 2002 John Money (USA)
 2004 Martin S. Weinberg (USA)
 2006 Richard Green (USA/UK)
 2008 Hu Peicheng (China)
  2016 João Décio Ferreira (Portugal)
Winners for contributions to sexual reform

 1990 Herman Musaph (Netherlands) 
 1992 Imre Aszódi (Hungary)
 1994 Ruth K. Westheimer ("Dr. Ruth"; USA)
 1997 Maj-Briht Bergström-Walan (Sweden)
 2000 Oswalt Kolle (Netherlands)
 2002 Manfred Bruns (Germany) and William Granzig (USA)
 2004 Rolf Gindorf (Germany)
 2006 Rita Süssmuth (Germany)
 2008 Robert T. Francoeur (USA)

References

Sexology
Sexual orientation and medicine
Science and technology awards
German awards
Magnus Hirschfeld